() is a Canadian French-language television mystery music game show series based on South Korean program I Can See Your Voice in the province of Quebec. Since its premiere on 13 September 2021, it has aired two seasons on Noovo.

Gameplay

Format
Presented with a group of six "mystery singers" identified only by their occupation, a guest artist and contestant must attempt to eliminate bad singers from the group without ever hearing them sing, assisted by clues and a celebrity panel over the course of four rounds. At the end of the game, the last remaining mystery singer is revealed as either good or bad by means of a duet between them and one of the guest artists.

Rewards
The contestant must eliminate one mystery singer at the end of each round, receiving  if they eliminate a bad singer. If the singer is bad, the contestant's winnings is given to the bad singer instead.

Rounds
Each episode presents the guest artist and contestant with six people whose identities and singing voices are kept concealed until they are eliminated to perform on the "stage of truth" or remain in the end to perform the final duet.

Notes:

Production

Background and development
Bell Media first announced the development of the series in joint collaboration with Incendo in March 2021. It is co-produced by Productions J and ToRoS; the staff team is managed by executive producer Julie Snyder, producer Marie-Pier Gaudreault, and director Benoît Giguere.

Filming
Tapings for the program took place at various locations such as Place Bell in Laval (for the first season) and Scène Éthique in Varennes (for the second season).

Broadcast

History
Qui sait chanter? debuted on 13 September 2021. During the first season broadcasts, the series has been already renewed for the second season, with regular episodes started airing on 19 September 2022.

Special episodes
In the second season, there are three theme-oriented specials. The premiere is a  Wild West theme (with ) on 12 September 2022, followed by Halloween theme (with Rita Baga) on 31 October 2022, and holiday theme (with ) on 12 December 2022.

Series overview

Episodes

Season 1 (2021)

Season 2 (2022)

Specials

Accolades

Notes

References

Qui sait chanter?
2021 Canadian television series debuts
2020s Canadian game shows
Canadian television series based on South Korean television series
French-language television shows
Noovo original programming
Television shows filmed in Quebec